Nino Tibilashvili (born 11 May 1997) is a Georgian wheelchair fencer. She won the silver in the women's sabre A event at the 2020 Summer Paralympics held in Tokyo, Japan.

References

External links
 

1997 births
Living people
Female sabre fencers from Georgia (country)
Paralympic silver medalists for Georgia (country)
Paralympic wheelchair fencers of Georgia (country)
Paralympic medalists in wheelchair fencing
Wheelchair fencers at the 2020 Summer Paralympics
Medalists at the 2020 Summer Paralympics
Place of birth missing (living people)
21st-century women from Georgia (country)